"Miss Jackson" is a song by American rock band Panic! at the Disco, released on July 15, 2013, as the first single for the band's fourth studio album, Too Weird to Live, Too Rare to Die! (2013). The song features vocals from Lolo. A music video directed by Jordan Bahat accompanied the song's announcement as well as the album's title and release date, and headlining tour dates. It was the band's first release since 2011, and the first release to feature Dallon Weekes on bass. The Butch Walker-produced track has been described as "darkly anthemic". It reached the top 10 on iTunes on its release and sold 56,000 digital downloads in its first week to debut at No. 68 on the Billboard Hot 100 and No. 27 on Digital Songs. It also became Panic! at the Disco's first top ten hit on the Alternative Songs chart since "Nine in the Afternoon" in 2008. In January 2015, it was certified Gold by the RIAA.

Writing and composition
"Miss Jackson" is titled after Janet Jackson and refers to her hit "Nasty" in the line "Miss Jackson, Are You nasty?" during its chorus. "Nasty" is notorious for the line "My first name ain't baby, it's Janet - Miss Jackson if you're nasty", which became widely used in pop culture in various forms and is an iconic catchphrase. The song is one of Jackson's signature hits and was released as the second single from her breakthrough album Control.

The song was originally titled "Bad Apple" as it contained a sample from Fiona Apple's tune "Every Single Night", but when the band played it for her she denied them publishing rights to use her melody. Lead singer Brendon Urie confessed to being 'pretty pissed' by the refusal, but also admitted he prefers the band's new approach to the song. Urie called Apple a "bitch" over her decision, which Apple later explained was because another singer had also recently sampled the song.

In an interview with MTV, the lead singer Brendon Urie, says the lyrics were based on personal experiences:
"'Miss Jackson' is about something that actually happened to me when I was younger. I hadn't really talked about it, and I felt that if I didn't, I would keep thinking about it, it would drive me crazy. When I was younger, I would mess around; I'd sleep with one girl one night, sleep with her friend the next night, and not care about how they felt, or how I made them feel. And then it happened to me and I realized 'Wow, that's what that feels like?'"

Release
Regarding the band's decision to release "Miss Jackson" as the lead single from their fourth studio album, Too Weird to Live, Too Rare to Die!, vocalist and guitarist Brendon Urie stated, "Every song on the album is pretty different from one another, but there are a lot of the sounds of the other songs are kind of mixed together in ["Miss Jackson"]. There are songs that range from something personal to something fictitious to a song about where I grew up in Vegas. This really sums up the vibe of the record, of this party record that we’re excited about." The song impacted alternative radio on July 30, 2013, and released to mainstream radio on November 11, 2013.

Music video
The music video for "Miss Jackson" was directed by Jordan Bahat and released on Fueled by Ramen's YouTube channel, featuring the American actress Katrina Bowden, who is known for playing Cerie on the NBC sitcom 30 Rock. The motel scene was filmed in Barstow, California. The video features Urie first in his house, while a burning tire is rolling (questionably a country community). Brendon smokes cigarettes as he walks outside, and then finds the leader of Barstow (Miss Jackson) and then she reveals that she also smokes. The two trade breaths as other people watch. Finally Miss Jackson attempts suicide, convincing Urie to kill him. As she says this, Urie is given a knife from her. The violence was blocked, but the woman’s head was shown bleeding as smoke came out of it. After that, the people all pray to Brendon as their new leader.

Chart performance

Weekly charts

Year-end charts

Certifications

References

2013 singles
Panic! at the Disco songs
Songs written by Brendon Urie
Janet Jackson
Songs written by Dallon Weekes
Songs written by Lolo (singer)
Songs written by Jake Sinclair (musician)
Song recordings produced by Butch Walker